William John Hunter (27 February 194021 May 2011) was an Australian actor of film, stage and television, who was also prominent as a voice-over artist. He appeared in more than 60 films and won two AFI Awards. He was also a recipient of the Centenary Medal.

Early life
Hunter was born in Ballarat, Victoria, the son of William and Francie Hunter. He had a brother, John, and a sister, Marie Ann.

During his teens, Hunter was a champion swimmer, and briefly held a world record for the 100 yards freestyle until his record was broken by John Devitt in the very next heat 10 minutes later. Hunter qualified for the Australian swimming team for the 1956 Summer Olympics in Melbourne, Australia before a bout of meningitis ended his Olympic hopes.

Career
Hunter made his film debut as an extra in 1957 film The Shiralee. An introduction to Ava Gardner saw him gain a job as an extra and swimming double in the Hollywood film On the Beach, which was filming in Melbourne. Hunter claimed that he was inspired to take up acting after watching one of the leads (variously claimed to be either Gregory Peck or Fred Astaire) do 27 takes of a scene, and thinking he could do better. He took an intensive drama course in Melbourne and sailed aboard the RHMS Ellinis on New Year's Eve 1964 for England. There he won a two-year scholarship to the prestigious Northampton Repertory Company in England. In 1966, Hunter made his first television appearance, two episodes in The Ark, a serial within the third season of the BBC television drama series Doctor Who.

Hunter returned to Australia in 1967 and began working in television drama and feature films. He had interviewed with Gavrik Losey in London making no great impression in that highly competitive atmosphere but Losey was able to offer Hunter his first Australian film appearance in Ned Kelly when it came into being in Australia with Losey as production supervisor. Hunter often played characters who were the strong, opinionated, archetypal gruff Australian whose exterior belies a softer heart and sensibilities vulnerable to pressure.

Some of his most notable movie roles include Mad Dog Morgan (1976), Newsfront (1978), Gallipoli (1981), The Dismissal, Scales of Justice (1983), Strictly Ballroom (1992), Muriel's Wedding (1994), The Adventures of Priscilla, Queen of the Desert (1994) and Australia (2008). In 2007, he reprised the role of Bob in the Australian touring stage production of Priscilla. He also provided the voice of the dentist in Finding Nemo (2003) and the voice of Bubo in Legend of the Guardians: The Owls of Ga'Hoole (2010). He portrayed United Nations Secretary General Spencer Chartwell in the American science fiction series Space: Above and Beyond. His last film role was in The Cup (2011).

Of acting, Hunter said, "As long as the director told me where to stand and what to say, I was happy. Anyone who says there's any more to it than that, is full of bullshit. ... It's a job. It is a craft, but there's no art involved. What you need is common sense and a reasonably rough head. You put on the makeup and the wardrobe, and that is half the performance. That upsets the purists, but never mind, they don't work as much as I do."

Personal life and death
Hunter's first marriage was to Robbie Anderson from 1963 to 1973, with whom he had a son, named James Hunter. His next marriage was to actress Pat Bishop, in 1976. According to writer Bob Ellis, the marriage was short-lived after Hunter ran off with their marriage celebrant. His third marriage was to artist and television presenter Rhoda Roberts, from 1993 until their divorce in 1999.

Hunter was a supporter of the Australian Labor Party, appearing in the party's official 1996 Federal Election Campaign advertisement.

On 15 May 2011, Hunter was admitted to Caritas Christi hospice in Kew after refusing to go to a hospital. Surrounded by family and friends, he died of Liver cancer on 21 May 2011, aged 71.

A memorial service for Hunter was held at Melbourne's Princess Theatre on 26 May 2011. Close friend and co-star Mick Molloy paid tribute to Bill Hunter on stage at the 54th Logie Awards in April 2012.

Filmography

Awards and honours
Hunter won the 1978 AFI Award for Best Actor in a Leading Role for Newsfront, and the 1981 Best Supporting Actor award for Gallipoli.

In 2001, he was awarded the Centenary Medal for service to acting.

A painting of Hunter by artist Jason Benjamin won the Packing Room Prize in conjunction with the 2005 Archibald Prize.

References

External links

 "Bill Hunter's list of film and television credits". The Australian. Retrieved on 21 May 2011
 Bill Hunter on australianscreen
 Strictly Heslop – Bill Hunter Tribute Fanzine

1940 births
2011 deaths
Australian male film actors
Australian male stage actors
Australian male television actors
Australian male voice actors
Australian male freestyle swimmers
Best Actor AACTA Award winners
Best Supporting Actor AACTA Award winners
Recipients of the Centenary Medal
People from Ballarat
Male actors from Victoria (Australia)
Deaths from liver cancer
Deaths from cancer in Victoria (Australia)